The ketchup as a vegetable controversy stemmed from proposed regulations of school lunches by the USDAs Food and Nutrition Service (FNS) in 1981, early in the presidency of Ronald Reagan. The regulations were intended to provide meal planning flexibility to local school lunch administrators coping with cuts to the National School Lunch Program enacted by the Omnibus Reconciliation Acts of 1980 and 1981. The proposed changes allowed administrators to meet nutritional requirements by crediting food items not explicitly listed. While ketchup was not mentioned in the original regulations, pickle relish was used as an example of an item that could count as a vegetable.

A similar controversy arose in 2011, when Congress passed a bill prohibiting the USDA from increasing the amount of tomato paste required to constitute a vegetable; the bill allowed pizza with two tablespoons (30 mL) of tomato paste to qualify as a vegetable.

Summary
The Omnibus Reconciliation Act of 1980, signed into law by President Jimmy Carter, reduced the Federal School Lunch and Child Nutrition Programs budget by approximately eight percent. Building upon these reductions, the Omnibus Reconciliation Act of 1981 (passed as the Gramm–Latta Budget) slashed the 1982 budget for the Federal School Lunch Program by an additional 25 percent. To administer the requirements made by the acts, the USDA's Food and Nutrition Service (FNS) was tasked with proposing ways to implement the regulations while maintaining nutritional requirements for school lunches despite the lower funding. Among the recommendations made in September 3, 1981 was a proposal to give local school lunch administrators flexibility in accrediting substitute food items that met FNS nutritional requirements and regulations. The report stated an item could not be counted as a bread that was not enriched or whole-grain, "but could credit a condiment such as pickle relish as a vegetable." 

While ketchup was not specifically mentioned as a potential substitute, critics demonstrated outrage in Congress and in the media against the Ronald Reagan administration for cutting school lunch budgets and allowing ketchup and other condiments to count as vegetables. According to New York Times reporter Benjamin Weinraub, "the opposition had a Dickensian field day of outrage and mockery that contrasted school children's shrinking meal subsidies with the Pentagon generals' groaning board of budget increases."

Legislative history
The Food and Nutrition Service proposed regulations had roots in four previous pieces of legislation: the National School Lunch Act of 1946, the Child Nutrition Act of 1966, the Omnibus Reconciliation Act of 1980, and the Omnibus Reconciliation Act of 1981.

National School Lunch Act 
The National School Lunch Act of 1946 established the nonprofit National School Lunch Program to ensure the health and well-being of American children and increase the domestic consumption of agricultural products and commodities. Under Section II of the National School Lunch Act, eligible students at all participating schools gained access to free or reduced-cost school lunches. Served lunches had to meet minimum nutrition requirements as stated in Section 9a, and as set by the Secretary of Agriculture. As the 1981 Food and Nutrition Service regulations later explained, while no formal requirement existed requiring that school lunches provide a specific percentage of daily nutrients, it had come to be expected that meals would generally provide one third of daily Recommended Dietary Allowances (RDA).

Child Nutrition Act 
The Child Nutrition Act of 1966 further enhanced and strengthened the National School Lunch Program by extending the Special Milk Program, piloting a breakfast program, and adding support for non-food items such as equipment and additional staff. In addition, the act centralized the management and ongoing administration of the School Lunch Program to the US Department of Agriculture.

Omnibus Reconciliation Act of 1980 
Within its broad goal to "implement the reconciliation requirements provided for in the First Concurrent Resolution on the Budget for the fiscal year 1981", the Omnibus Reconciliation Act of 1980 amended both the National School Lunch Act of 1946 and the Child Nutrition Act of 1966 by cutting funding for the School Milk Program, establishing ceiling rates for grants on nutrition, and reducing provisions to specific, qualified institutions. It also made a range of cost-savings provisions—including reducing federal funding for school lunch general reimbursements, commodity, special assistance, and the child care food program-to reduce the Federal School Lunch and Child Nutrition Programs budget by eight percent.

Omnibus Reconciliation Act of 1981 
Title VIII of the Omnibus Reconciliation Act of 1981 extended the spending cuts enacted by the Omnibus Reconciliation Act of 1980 to include ending federal assistance for food service materials and shrinking appropriations allocated for nutrition education, special assistance, the child care food program, and the School Milk Program. The term "school", as defined in the Child Nutrition Act, now excluded private institutions with annual tuition exceeding specified amounts. The act also revised the income eligibility standards which determined which students received reduced cost or no-cost lunches and introduced stricter checks and balances to prevent income fudging. The previous requirement that a child's family income be at or below $17,560 to receive a reduced cost or no-cost lunch was dropped to $15,630 and the following new income standards were established:
 Children of families with an income of $10,990 or less qualified for a free lunch (previously this was $11,520); and
 Children of families with incomes between $10,990 and $15,630 were eligible for a reduced-price meal. 

The act established the subsidy cuts of 11 cents on full-price meals, 23 cents on reduced-cost meals, and three cents on free meals. As a result, the cost for a reduced-cost meal doubled to 40 cents over the prior year.

Section 818 of the act required that the Secretary of Agriculture review nutritional requirements of Section 10 of the Child Nutrition Act to find opportunities for cost savings at the local level. The act went on to require the USDA to "exhaust all alternatives for lowering local program costs" and ensure that proposals demonstrated a notable fiscal impact to the local community while meeting nutritional requirements. While all alternative plans had to meet the nutritional requirements established by the Secretary of Agriculture, the act did not require meals to deliver one third of RDA.

Other elements of the act included spending reductions in student loan programs; civil service, postal service, and related programs; highway and rail; airport and airway improvements; veterans' programs; small business; Medicare and Medicaid; and Social Security Act Programs.

Food and Nutrition Service proposed regulations
The Omnibus Reconciliation Act of 1981 required that final regulations be made available by November 11, 1981–90 days after the act's signing into law— and assigned the USDA's Food and Nutrition Service with proposing regulations to carry out the act's requirements. At the time the act became law, over 26 million children in 94,000 schools participated in the National School Lunch Plan. Of the participating students, 38 percent received free meals, 7 percent received reduced-price meals, and over half (55 percent) paid full cost.

As requested in Section 818 of the act, such proposed regulations had to be based on a full review of all potential cost saving opportunities that local school districts could implement. The administrator and staff of the Food and Nutrition Service participated in a countrywide fact-finding mission, interviewing local school lunch administrators to discuss cost-effective options that gave them more flexibility in meal planning. In his testimony before the Subcommittee on Elementary, Secondary, and Vocational Education on September 17, 1981, FNS Administrator G. William Hoagland described the ongoing frustration expressed by local school lunch administrators in having to adhere to strict guidelines in what foods to serve. "This is not a homogeneous nation. It is a compendium of likes and tastes", he said. Hoagland stated that the resulting proposed regulations reflected the opinions and needs communicated by local school districts.

Overall goals 
The Food and Nutrition Service's Proposed Plan was designed around three major goals towards providing more flexibility to local programs: 
 to simplify administration of the National School Lunch Program as well as the School Breakfast Program and Child Care Program, 
 reduce meal portion requirements, and 
 revise how certain foods were counted towards nutrition goals.

Section I: removing red tape in record keeping & streamlining administration 
Several of the report's recommendations centered on eliminating some of the School Lunch Program record keeping and cost reporting burdens required of local school administrators. The report proposed streamlining procedures for school mid-year announcements and eliminating school biannual estimates of eligible subsidized lunch recipients. In addition, the report proposed removing the Hardship Provision, which had allowed families to file claims for unexpected high costs.

Beyond simplifying school-wide reporting requirements, the report focused on adjusting the number of age/grade patterns and their associated meal plans. Instead of the previous five age-specific groups, the report suggested streamlining meal plans to fall within three, more general groups—preschool, elementary, and secondary students—and made such meal portions consistent within these specified groups. Additionally, school administrators were advised to focus on bulk production rather than per-plate individual quantities and encouraged to develop their own per-plate monitoring systems.

Section II: meal crediting 
Designed to give school lunch administrators increased flexibility and broader food choices when planning school lunches, the FNS proposed additional food choices that could be offered. Such additions complied with the overall five food plan that required all school lunches include a meat, milk, bread, and two vegetables or fruit. Alternates were proposed for all five food groups. 

 Meat Alternates: Peanuts along with other nuts and seeds and their associated butters could be served as a replacement for half of the meat requirement. In addition, yogurt, tofu, and equivalencies of dry beans, peas, or eggs could also be considered meat alternates. Instead of requiring meat or a meat alternate to make up the main dish of the meal, the report proposed eliminating this requirement to increase cost savings and give local officials more flexibility.
 Vegetables and Fruits: The report proposed adjusting the two or more servings of fruit or vegetables meal requirement that had been in place since 1958 to allow such dishes to be served separately or combined. The report adjusted requirements related to fruit/vegetable concentrates and eliminated requirements that vegetable or fruit juice can only account for half of a vegetable serving. 
 Bread: The regulations proposed expanding the definition of bread to include any food with enriched or whole-grain flour. For example, pasta, crackers, dry cereals, rolls, pretzels, rice, and rolled oats were also listed as foods that could be counted towards the bread requirement. 
 Milk: The report proposed eliminating milk-type requirements thereby allowing schools to choose the type of milk to serve. While 1979 meal plan requirements were expanded to allow school lunch administrators to also serve low fat, skim, and buttermilk in addition to whole milk, storage and inventory issues made the additional selections a hindrance. Administrators could serve yogurt instead of milk to meet this requirement of the meal plan.

School choice in crediting food alternates: pickle relish as a vegetable 
Section II of the FNS proposed regulations concluded expounding the benefits of increased menu variety in increasing children's knowledge of different types of foods and in improving overall nutritional education. Because there were a host of viable, alternate food options not specifically mentioned in the report, the FNS gave state agencies authority to explore additional alternates as long as they were reported to the FNS and met the meal crediting requirements. Bread that was not made of enriched flour would not count as a bread alternate, but a state "could credit a condiment such as pickle relish as a vegetable (Section II, 5)".

Quantity reductions 
To generate the immediate cost savings required in the Omnibus Budget Reconciliation Act of 1981, the FNS authors argued that simplifying administrative burdens and introducing choice and flexibility with alternative meal options could only do so much. As a result, the report proposed decreasing food quantities served while still contributing to a student's daily RDA intake. The FNS detailed minimum quantity requirements to receive federal reimbursement—schools could still serve larger portions. In addition, under the FNS' offer versus serve proposal, while children would be offered full-size portions of all five meal items, high school students could choose to take only three. Children would also have the option to request tasting-size portions of each meal component instead of full portions. Under the proposal, minimum quantities of the following food components were reduced:
 For 4th, 5th, and 6th graders: A required meat or meat alternate was reduced from two ounces to 1.5 ounces (the 1.5 ounce quantity was already required for the younger grades)
 For all elementary/secondary students: A vegetable or fruit serving was reduced from three-quarters of a cup to a half-cup and bread was reduced from eight servings/week to one serving/day 
 For preschool students: Milk was reduced from six to four ounces for preschool students and from eight to six ounces for elementary students

In his testimony before the Subcommittee on Elementary, Secondary, and Vocational Education of the Committee on Education and Labor of the U.S. House of Representatives, G. William Hoagland, administrator of the Food and Nutrition Service, defended these changes and contended that despite reduced quantities, such meals would "continue to be excellent nutrient sources". Hoagland explained that caloric intake would be reduced by four percent (from 21 percent to 17 percent), but certain meal components surpassed existing RDA requirements: protein and niacin met half of RDA; vitamin A, riboflavin, vitamin B-12 exceed one third of RDA; and calcium and vitamin C met the one third requirement.

Reaction
The critical response centered on several key elements of the proposed regulations:

Ketchup
Reporting on the proposed directive, Newsweek magazine illustrated its story with a bottle of ketchup captioned "now a vegetable". The proposal was criticized by nutritionists and Democratic politicians who staged photo ops where they dined on nutrition-poor meals that conformed to the new lax standards. Compounding this outrage, the same day that the USDA announced the cost-cutting proposal for school lunches, the White House purchased $209,508 worth of new china and place settings embossed in gold with the presidential seal.

During her testimony before the Subcommittee on Elementary, Secondary, and Vocational Education on September 17, 1981, Food Research and Action Center Director Nancy Amidei described a "mini meal" that she stated would meet the proposed FNS standards made up of a 1.5-ounce (42 g) hamburger, half of a roll, nine grapes, six ounces of milk (175 mL), and six French fries. She described a second meal that included "a lot of relish and ketchup on a tiny hamburger" as also meeting the full quantity of both meat and vegetables as established by the new regulations. The Food Research and Action Center, among other nutritional advocacy groups, were part of an opposition campaign that, according to proponents of the new FNS regulations, lacked faith in local school lunch administrators to plan healthy school lunches that adhered to the new standards.  

Multiple articles in the press voiced conflicting statements on the ketchup controversy. A September 1981 Reuters piece stated "ketchup, which has a high sugar content, was defined under new Government rules as a vegetable", while a December New York Times piece noted that "ketchup, of course was never mentioned in the proposals, which were designed to give local school officials more flexibility in planning their meals." Administrator Hoagland responded to the media generated by the ketchup controversy, stating "it's an insult to me and to school lunchroom officials to say that we would even consider forcing kids to eat ketchup as a vegetable."

While ketchup was not explicitly referenced as a vegetable substitute in the regulations, the condiment became an easy visual for skeptics to cite when criticizing the Reagan Administration and the proposed regulations. Reporter Benjamin Weinraub called the issue "the Emperor's new condiments", and reporter Russell Baker gave President Reagan the tongue-in-cheek "Sore President of the Year Award" writing "it was given to President Reagan on the basis of reports that in spite of the ever-pleasant smile, he is secretly sore on his old botany teacher for telling him that ketchup is a vegetable."

Changes in income eligibility
Under the new standards, "kids who were poor last year aren't anymore", said Edward Cooney, attorney with the Food Research and Action Center and a critic of the regulations. Other advocacy groups including the American School Food Service Association projected that changes in eligibility would drive schools to drop out of the program. Marshall L. Matz, an attorney for the association, stated that less than one third of students would be eligible for subsidized lunches in the majority of school districts. Unless the Federal Government was able to expand assistance, school districts would be unable to serve such higher-priced lunches he hypothesized.

In his testimony before the Subcommittee on Elementary, Secondary, and Vocational Education, Pennsylvania Representative William F. Goodling countered this opinion stating that schools in the country's highest poverty areas would be the least affected by the subsidy reductions and "will be receiving a greater Federal reimbursement than any of the other schools." 

As voiced by FNS Administrator Hoagland, increasing the costs for full-priced meals and reducing portion sizes, as recommended in the regulations, were necessary to ensure the continued participation of schools in the School Lunch Program. Low-income children would be hurt more if schools dropped the program as they would not receive free or subsidized lunches.

Diluting nutrition
Critics of the proposed regulations argued that low-income children would be the most affected by the proposed meal quantity reductions in the plan as they depend upon school lunches for upwards of half of their daily nutrients. Carl D. Perkins, Subcommittee Chairman and US Representative from Kentucky, cited a Washington State study which found the state's low income children received 48 percent of their daily nutrition intake from the meals offered in the School Lunch Program. In the hearing, he voiced the concern of other critics of the regulation, asking, "By watering down the requirements for a school lunch, isn't the department showing it is not concerned with the health of millions of low-income children who cannot supplement their diets with alternative sources of nutrition?"

In his testimony before the Subcommittee on Elementary, Secondary, and Vocational Education, FNS Administrator Hoagland countered this statistic citing the Nationwide Food Consumption Survey of 1977–1978 which found that children's eating patterns have evolved from eating three to now five meals a day, and that the previous theory that children receive one third of nutrients at lunch time was no longer true. In addition, Hoagland noted that the recent expansion of the Food Stamp Program (which supported those with an income of 130 percent of the gross income poverty line) and other similar programs that provided food assistance to low-income children now offered an additional safety net to such populations.

Another argument in support of the adjusted meal plans was voiced by Elizabeth Cagan, director of the New York City Bureau of School Lunches at the subcommittee hearing: "Unless food gets inside a kid, it doesn't give him any nutrition", She added that in New York City she has observed much food served to younger children was wasted – especially green beans, peas, carrots, and mixed vegetables.

Results
Nearly 400 participating schools, serving an estimated 2.8 million students, dropped out of the School Lunch Program between September 1980 and September 1981. Specific school districts witnessed large percentages of students choosing to bring their own lunch rather than pay the now higher priced meals. For example, in Clark County, Nevada, nearly half (46 percent) of students dropped out of the program as a result of a 30 percent increase in the cost of subsidized meal costs.

On September 25, 1981, President Reagan withdrew the original regulations proposed by the Food and Nutrition Service due in part to the sharp criticism from the opposition. Afterwards the Food and Nutrition Service submitted revised proposals on November 17, 1981 that removed all mention of condiments counting as vegetables and adhered to the goal of providing one third of all daily nutrients in school lunches.

Despite such revisions, the Reagan Administration's policy was never implemented and FNS Administrator Hoagland was fired at the end of November. 

"Mr. Hoagland... was lashed on Capitol Hill and skewered by the White House, which removed him from his job two days before Thanksgiving." Hoagland attributed the strength of hunger lobby groups as the source of the FNS regulations downfall. "I may have let the President down by not carefully orchestrating the groups." According to The Washington Post, "there's a lobby guarding every dish."

Similar efforts
In 2011, Congress passed a bill that barred the USDA from changing its nutritional guidelines for school lunches. The proposed changes would have limited the amount of potatoes allowed in lunches, required more green vegetables, and declared a half-cup of tomato paste to count as a serving of vegetables, rather than the current standard of 2 tablespoons (30 mL). The blocking of these proposed higher standards meant that the smaller amount of tomato paste in pizza could continue to be counted as a vegetable in school lunches. The move resulted in widespread mockery, with headlines saying Congress had declared pizza to be a vegetable. The blocking legislation was criticized heavily, since the change had also been lobbied for by food companies such as ConAgra, and the block was a substantial blow to efforts to make school lunches healthier.

See also
Nix v. Hedden
School meal programs in the United States
Stigler diet

References

Ketchup
Reagan administration controversies
Vegetables
School meal programs in the United States
United States Department of Agriculture
Metaphors referring to food and drink
1981 controversies in the United States